The 2011 Calgary Stampeders season was the 54th season for the team in the Canadian Football League and their 73rd overall. The Stampeders finished in 3rd place in the West Division with an 11–7 record and lost the West Semi-Final game to the Edmonton Eskimos.

Offseason

CFL draft
The 2011 CFL Draft took place on Sunday, May 8, 2011. The Stampeders had six selections in the draft, with the first coming in the third spot overall, after trading their sixth overall pick to the BC Lions. Through the trade, Calgary was able to select local star receiver Anthony Parker with their first pick, who was ranked as the number one receiver available in the draft. The Stampeders also selected Ottawa Quarterback Brad Sinopoli, who had been discussed as the best non-import QB to be available in a long time.

Preseason

Regular season

Season standings

Season schedule
The September, 25 game against the Hamilton Tiger-Cats will be played in Moncton, New Brunswick as a part of the Touchdown Atlantic series.

Roster

Coaching staff

Playoffs

Schedule

Bracket

*-Team won in Overtime.

West Semi-Final

References

Calgary Stampeders seasons
CalgCalgary Stampeders Season, 2011
2011 in Alberta